Toyotamaphimeia machikanensis (Toyotama-hime from Mountain Machikane (:ja:待兼山)) is an extinct gavialid crocodylian which lived in Japan during the Pleistocene. A specimen recovered in 1964 at Osaka University during the construction of a new science building has been dated to around 430–380 thousand years old based on the stratum in which it was found. Unassigned species from same genus is also known from Taiwan. It  was originally described as a member of the genus Tomistoma.

History and naming

The first bones belonging to Toyotamaphimeia were discovered on May 3rd 1964 during the construction of a new school building on the grounds of Ôsaka University. A field survey was conducted shortly afterwards, confirming the presence of more fossils, however not yet identifying their crocodilian nature. Following the survey several digs were organized starting on the 9th of June 1964. The skull was found on the 17th of September during the 2nd dig. A third excavation was held in December which yielded more material of Toyotamaphimeia as well as fossil shellfish, insects and plant remains. Finally a 4th excavation took place in January of 1965. Following analysis of the fossils, the material was assigned to the genus Tomistoma and named Tomistoma machikanense. 

In 1983, 18 years after the initial discovery, the skull was redescribed and deemed different enough from Tomistoma to erect a new genus, Toyotamaphimeia creating the comb. nov. Toyotamaphimeia machikanensis. In turn Aoki also changed the species name from machikanense to machikanensis, as the new genus name was feminine. The generic name derives from Toyotama-hime, a goddess of Japanese mythology with the ability to change her appearance to that of a crocodile. The species epithet means "from Mountain Machikane".

Description
The holotype of Toyotamaphimeia is a nearly complete skeleton consisting of a skull, an entire cervical and dorsal series of vertebrae, various ribs, 33 osteoderms as well as almost half the bones of the limbs, hip region and pectoral girdle. Most of the tail past the 3rd cervical vertebra is missing, making it difficult to determine the exact length of the animal.

Toyotamaphimeia'''s skull is triangular in shape and longirostrine. Most of that length is taken up by the maxilla and the nasal bones penetrate the premaxilla dorsally, extending deep into the premaxilla to the level of the 3rd maxillary alveoli, but not coming in contact with the nares. The skulltable of the holotype is crushed and damaged just before the orbits. The dentaries are broken off at the anterior end and each preserves 10 alveoli. The absence of any grooves or confluence of alveoli suggests that the specimen is mature, which is consistent with its great size.

Paleobiology
The holotype specimen (MOUF00001) preserves a series of pathologies described by Katsura in 2004. The mandible is broken off at the tip, the tibia and fibula have been fractured and healed and some of the osteoderms present preserve healing bite marks. The fact that these injuries healed is evidence that the animal survived for a while after being injured and Katsura suggests that they may have been the result of intraspecific fights, furthermore hypothesizing that this could mean the Osaka University specimen may have been a male.

Although the holotype of Toyotamaphimeia is the first substantial and best preserved evidence of crocodilians in Japan, there are other remains found across the islands. The northernmost finds were made in the Iwate Prefecture (northern Honshu) while their range extends south to Nagasaki Prefacture (Kyushu Island). At this latitude Toyotamaphimeia would have existed at the thermal limit of crocodilians. The Ibaraki Formation, where the remains of Toyotamaphimeia have been found, is part of the Osaka Group, which consists of lacustrine and fluvial deposits of the Pliocene to Pleistocene. Specifically, the fossils belong to the Kasuri Tuff, which dates to the Chibanian age of the Pleistocene. Molluscs, pollen and plant fossils (species of lotus and water caltrop found in the Kasuri Tuff suggest a moderate climate. Toyotamaphimeia would have most likely coexisted in this area alongside Stegodon orientalis, Cervus kazusensis, Panthera youngi, Bubalus teihardi and Stephanorhinus. The pollen found in the region suggests a vegetation consisting of alders, beeches, pines and Cryptomeria (Japanese redwood).

Phylogeny
Below is a cladogram based morphological studies comparing skeletal features that shows Toyotamaphimeia as a member of Tomistominae, related to the false gharial:

Based on morphological studies of extinct taxa, the tomistomines (including the living false gharial) were long thought to be classified as crocodiles and not closely related to gavialoids. However, recent molecular studies using DNA sequencing have consistently indicated that the false gharial (Tomistoma) (and by inference other related extinct forms in Tomistominae) actually belong to Gavialoidea (and Gavialidae).

Below is a cladogram from a 2018 tip dating study by Lee & Yates simultaneously using morphological, molecular (DNA sequencing), and stratigraphic (fossil age) data that shows Toyotamaphimeia'' as a gavialid, related to both the gharial and the false gharial:

References

External links 
 
 

Gavialidae
Fossil taxa described in 1983
Fossils of Japan
Prehistoric pseudosuchian genera
Pleistocene crocodylomorphs
Pleistocene reptiles of Asia
Pleistocene genus first appearances